Athenais or Athenaïs is a given name which may refer to:

Athenais (seer), 4th century BC prophetess who told Alexander the Great of his allegedly divine descent
Athenais Philostorgos I (fl. 1st century BC), Queen of Cappadocia
Athenais Philostorgos II (fl. 1st century BC), princess from the Kingdom of Pontus and through marriage a Roman client Queen of Cappadocia
Athenais of Media Atropatene (fl. 1st century BC), princess from the Kingdom of Commagene and wife of Artavasdes I of Media Atropatene 
Athenais (daughter of Herodes Atticus) (141-161), noblewoman who lived in the Roman Empire
Athenais (great-granddaughter of Herodes Atticus), Roman noblewoman who lived between the second half of the 2nd century and first half of the 3rd century
Aelia Eudocia (c. 401-460), birth name Athenais, wife of East Roman Emperor Theodosius II
Françoise-Athénaïs, marquise de Montespan (1641–1707), better known as Madame de Montespan, chief mistress of King Louis XIV of France